The 109th Virginia General Assembly was the meeting of the legislative branch of the Virginia state government from 1916 to 1918, after the 1915 state elections. It convened in Richmond for one session, which started on January 12, 1916, and ended on March 18, 1916.

Background
The 1916 General Assembly took place during the latter half of Henry Carter Stuart's governorship. It was the last full session during which J. Taylor Ellyson served as lieutenant governor and president of the state senate; as of 2013, he is the only person in Virginia history to have served three terms in that office.

On November 1, 1916, seven months after the body adjourned, statewide prohibition went into effect. Senator G. Walter Mapp and temperance advocate James Cannon, Jr. (not to be confused with Senator James E. Cannon) drafted the final bill after voters endorsed a referendum in September 1914.

Party summary
Resignations and new members are discussed in the "Changes in membership" section, below.

Senate

House of Delegates

Senate

Leadership

Members

House of Delegates

Leadership

Members

Changes in membership

Senate
December 7, 1917, Theodore C. Pilcher (D-11th district) dies. Seat remains unfilled until start of next regular session.

See also
 List of Virginia state legislatures

References

Government of Virginia
Virginia legislative sessions
1916 in Virginia
1917 in Virginia
1916 U.S. legislative sessions
1917 U.S. legislative sessions